In mathematics, an element x of a Lie group or a Lie algebra is called an n-Engel element, named after Friedrich Engel, if it satisfies the ''n-Engel condition that the repeated commutator [...[[x,y],y], ..., y] with n copies of y is trivial (where [x, y] means x−1y−1xy or the Lie bracket).  It is called an Engel element if it satisfies the Engel condition that it is n-Engel for some n.

A Lie group or Lie algebra is said to satisfy the Engel or n-Engel conditions if every element does. Such groups or algebras are called Engel groups,  n-Engel groups, Engel algebras,  and n''-Engel algebras.

Every nilpotent group or Lie algebra is Engel. Engel's theorem states that every finite-dimensional Engel algebra is nilpotent.  gave  examples of non-nilpotent Engel groups and algebras.

Notes

Group theory
Lie algebras